Jeeto Pakistan League (JPL) is a Pakistani Ramadan reality television game show where celebrities are seen competing with each other in an indoor game format. It is a special "league"-based edition of the game show, Jeeto Pakistan. Presented by Fahad Mustafa, it started airing from Ramadan 2020 on ARY Digital.

Format 
A "league"-based format where teams representing six major cities Karachi, Lahore, Islamabad, Multan, Quetta and Peshawar would compete against each other, with each team led by a notable celebrity. Each episode also features guest celebrities supporting there favourite teams and new contestants would be drawn for each episode while maintaining social distancing due to COVID-19, and the top two teams with most points would qualify for a final play-off. Members of the public would be able to participate in the show through live calls.

Teams
The show consists of seven teams competing for grand prize.

Seasons 
 Season 1 (25 April 2020 – 23 May 2020)  
 Season 2 (14 April 2021 – 12 May 2021)  
 Season 3 (3 April 2022 – 1 May 2022)

Production 
In the Ramadan season of 2020, the show's format was changed in light of the coronavirus pandemic and the studio audience was eliminated. Instead, a "league"-based format was introduced where teams representing five major cities would compete against each other, with each team led by a notable celebrity. New contestants would be drawn for each episode while maintaining social distancing, and the top two teams with most points would qualify for a final play-off. Members of the public would be able to participate in the show through live calls.

In 2021, 6th team was announced as Multan Tigers for the city Multan. Shoaib Malik was selected as a captain of Multan Tigers team. Aijaz Aslam was replaced by Sarfraz Ahmed as the captain of Quetta Knights team as Sarfraz Ahmed was busy in Pakistan vs South Africa ODI series.

In 2022, Ushna Shah joined the game show as Karachi Lions Captain replacing Humayun Saeed. Sarfraz Ahmed rejoined the league after 2020 for Quetta Knights team. 7th team was announced as Gujranwala Bulls for the city Gujranwala. Aijaz Aslam, who was Quetta Knights captain in 2021, was selected as a captain of Gujranwala Bulls.

Controversy
In 2020, Few days after the show started on-air, the video of Siddiqui goes viral where he was seen misbehaving with rival team captain Sarfaraz Ahmed. Many people and celebrities criticized Siddiqui and called the act disrespectful. In the later episode, Siddiqui apologises to Ahmed and his fans saying he didn't mean it. Following his apology both Ahmed and Mustafa told him it's all good and no apologies were required to begin with.

References 

2020 Pakistani television series debuts
ARY Digital original programming
Pakistani game shows
Television shows set in Karachi
Urdu-language television shows
Ramadan special television shows